Sedan is a commune in the Ardennes department and Grand Est region of north-eastern France. It is also the chef-lieu (administrative centre) of the arrondissement of the same name.

Location
The town is situated about 200 km from Paris, 85 km north-east of Reims, and 10 km south of the border with Belgium. The historic centre occupies a peninsula formed by a bend in the river Meuse. Sedan station has rail connections to Charleville-Mézières, Reims and Longwy. The A34 autoroute links Sedan with Charleville-Mézières and Reims.

History
Sedan was founded in 1424. In the 16th century Sédan was an asylum for Protestant refugees from the Wars of Religion.

Until 1651, the Principality of Sedan belonged to the La Tour d'Auvergne family. It was at that time a sovereign principality. Their representative, Marshal Turenne, was born at Sedan on 11 September 1611. With help from the Holy Roman Empire, it defeated France at the Battle of La Marfée. Immediately after its victory, Sedan was besieged and its prince, Frédéric Maurice de La Tour d'Auvergne, duc de Bouillon, submitted to France. It was annexed to France in return for sparing the prince's life after he became involved in a conspiracy against France.

Sedan was the birthplace of Jacques MacDonald, a general who served in the Napoleonic Wars.

In the 1840s, American composer-pianist Louis Moreau Gottschalk got his start in Europe with a successful concert in Sedan, including the original piece "Souvenir des Ardennes."

During the Franco-Prussian War, on 2 September 1870, French emperor Napoleon III was taken prisoner with 100,000 of his soldiers at the First Battle of Sedan. Due to this victory, which made the unification of Germany possible, 2 September was declared Sedan Day (Sedantag) and a national German holiday in 1871. It remained a holiday until 1919.

Sedan was occupied by the Germans for four years during World War I. On 13 November 1917, the German Crown Prince paraded the 13th Infantry Division over the course of "d'Alsace-Lorraine".

From May 12 to 15, 1940, during World War II, German troops invaded neutral Belgium and crossed the river Meuse by winning the Second Battle of Sedan. The battle allowed them to win the Battle of France by bypassing the Maginot Line, which was the French fortification system, and entrapping the Allied Forces that were advancing east into Belgium, as part of the Allied Dyle Plan strategy.

Points of interest

Castle

Construction started in 1424 and the castle's defences were constantly improved over the ages. It is the only remaining part of the once enormous fortifications in and around the town.

Other points of interest
 Jardin botanique de Sedan
  in May

Population

Economy
A centre of cloth production, begun under the patronage of Cardinal Mazarin, supported the town until the late nineteenth century.

Sport

CS Sedan Ardennes is based in the town.

Notable people
 Charles Baudin (1792–1854), admiral
 Frédéric Brillant (born 1985), professional football player
 Élise Bussaglia (born 1985), professional football player
 Pierre Cartier (born 1932), mathematician
 Jean de Collas (1678–1753), architect  
 Yves Congar (1904–1995), French Dominican theologian and cardinal
 Michel Fourniret (1942–2021), serial killer
 Frederick V (1596-1632), Count Palatine and Elector of the Palatinate from 1610 to 1623 and King of Bohemia (as Frederick I) from 1619 to 1620
 René Guyon (1876–1963), jurist
 Benjamin Lemaire (born 1985), writer and film director
 Marie-Jeanne Larrivée Lemière (1733 - 1786), dramatic soprano
 Étienne-Jacques-Joseph-Alexandre MacDonald (1765–1840), Marshal of France
 Yannick Noah (born 1960), former professional tennis player
 Vicomte de Turenne (1611–1675), Marshal of France

Twin towns
  Eisenach, Germany, since 1991
  Sedan, Kansas

See also
 Communes of the Ardennes department
 CS Sedan Ardennes, football club based in Sedan
 French Towns and Lands of Art and History
 Sedan chair
 Stade Louis Dugauguez, a multi-use stadium in Sedan

Notes

External links

 Sedan city council website 
 The German breakthrough in 1940
 Webpage about the fortifications of Sedan
 Article on the Battle of Sedan at 'Battlefields Europe'

 
1424 establishments in Europe
1420s establishments in France
Communes of Ardennes (department)
Populated places established in the 1420s
Subprefectures in France
Champagne (province)
Ardennes communes articles needing translation from French Wikipedia
Vauban fortifications in France